Propostira is a genus of Asian comb-footed spiders that was first described by Eugène Louis Simon in 1894.  it contains two species, found in Sri Lanka and India: P. quadrangulata and P. ranii.

See also
 List of Theridiidae species

References

Further reading

Araneomorphae genera
Spiders of Asia
Theridiidae